Gigantoscelus ("giant shin") is a dubious genus of basal sauropodomorph dinosaur from the Early Jurassic of South Africa.

Classification
It was first described by van Hoepen in 1916 on the basis of TrM 65, a distal femur from the Bushveld Sandstone Formation of South Africa. It was later synonymized with Euskelosaurus by van Heerden (1979), but was subsequently treated as a nomen dubium in the 2nd edition of the Dinosauria.

Stratigraphy
The type horizon of Gigantoscelus, the Bushveld Sandstone, was thought to be Late Triassic, but is now considered Early Jurassic (Hettangian-Sinemurian) in age.

References

Sauropodomorphs
Early Jurassic dinosaurs of Africa
Fossils of South Africa
Fossil taxa described in 1916